The Przedbórz Synagogue was a wooden synagogue in Przedbórz, Poland.

History

A Jewish community is documented to have been established in Przedbórz by 1570. At the beginning of World War II, the town was 60% Jewish.

The building was erected after the previous synagogue burnt down in 1754, but completed by 1760, the date given on a wall painting.

It was destroyed in 1939.

Architecture

The synagogue of Przedbórz, regarded as one of Poland's "most beautiful" wooden synagogues, once drew tourists to the small town.

The synagogue, built on a stone foundation, featured a main hall 14.20 meters long with a women's balcony above a large vestibule or side hall. The barrel vaulted main hall rose to a height of 8.80 meters.  The wooden, barrel vaulted ceiling was paneled in wood in an intricate lunette and star motif that gave something of the impression of an intricate, curved lattice work. An elaborate, octagonal, Baroque Bimah rose in three tiers almost to the ceiling, but ended in a decorative finial topped by an eagle with wings outspread, and did not touch or support the roof. The Baroque Torah Ark was elaborately carved with lions rampant, floral decorations, and animals.

The walls were elaborately painted with a menorah, an illustration of Psalm 137 featuring trees beside the river of Babylon with musical instruments hanging form the branches, landscapes of towns, the texts of prayers surrounded by garlands of leaves and flowers, and other motifs. High on the north wall a painted legend read, "This is the work of Yehuda Leb's own hands, 1760."

Reconstruction project

In 2002, Congregation Beth Israel of Berkeley, California, in need of a new building, began a campaign to construct a replica of the Przedbórz Synagogue. The project had to be abandoned when fundraising fell short.

Gallery

References

Former synagogues in Poland
Wooden synagogues
Baroque synagogues in Poland
18th-century synagogues
Radomsko County
Buildings and structures in Łódź Voivodeship
Wooden buildings and structures in Poland